Blounce is a small hamlet in the civil parish of South Warnborough in the Hart district of Hampshire, England. It lies on the B3349 road in between Alton and Odiham. The hamlet is only made up of a few cottages and was once a main crossing point between Alton and Odiham.

References

Hamlets in Hampshire